Zinwrath: The Movie is a 2005 story-line-based machinima production created using the World of Warcraft game engine. It is one of the first World of Warcraft machinima films.

The film is directed and produced by Dementia Studios' Benjamin Pickerel and Derek Hackleman, written by Benjamin Pickerel and Jeremy E. Jones, with music and sound production by Myndflame Studios' Clint Hackleman, and starring Benjamin Pickerel, Jeremy E. Jones, Kristopher Haughey, Michael Scott, and Clint Hackleman. Editing and visual effects were done by Derek Hackleman. The movie also features the Myndflame song "MC Raiders", written and produced by Clint Hackleman.

Zinwrath: The Movie has had over 1,000,000 downloads and was a winner in the 2005 BlizzCon Movie Contest. It was also nominated for the 2006 Xfire Machinima Awards for Best Movie and for the Fourth Annual Golden Llamas award for Best World of Warcraft Movie. Zinwrath: The Movie was first aired on television on October 19, 2005 for G4TV's Cinematech.

Zinwrath is the title character of the movie, a warlock created and voiced by Benjamin Pickerel. The short film follows Zinwrath and his cohorts, Basutei the paladin, Sicknot the mage, and Burakubuu the night elf merchant as they each over-complicate and muddle their way through initially simple situations. Along the way they encounter the desperately lonely Dirti the gnome, and the arrogant, axe-wielding warrior Kiljoy.

Cast
 Benjamin Pickerel as Zinwrath
 Jeremy E. Jones as Burakubuu
 Kristopher Haughey as Basutei
 Michael Scott as Sicknot
 Clint Hackleman as Dirti
 Benjamin Bullock as Kiljoy
 Other minor characters voiced by Clint Hackleman and Benjamin Pickerel

External links
Zinwrath: The Movie on Warcraftmovies.com
Zinwrath on the Internet Movie Database

Machinima works
2005 animated films
2005 films